Justyna Bąk (born August 1, 1974) is a long-distance runner from Poland, who specializes mainly in the 3000 metres steeplechase. She is a four-time national champion in the women's 5,000 metres, and a former world record holder in the 3,000 metres steeple. She was born in Biłgoraj.

Bąk won the 2003 edition of the Cross Internacional de Venta de Baños.

References

External links 
 

1974 births
Living people
People from Biłgoraj
Sportspeople from Lublin Voivodeship
Polish female long-distance runners
Polish female steeplechase runners
World record setters in athletics (track and field)
20th-century Polish women
21st-century Polish women